Romeo Bezușcu (born July 1, 1964) is a former Romanian rugby union football player. He played as a fly-half.

Club career
Bezuscu played for RCJ Farul Constanța, with which he won a Masters tournament in France alongside Vasile Ion, Florea Opris, Adrian Lungu and Emilian Grigore.

International career
Bezușcu earned 2 caps for Romania, from his debut in 1985 to his last game in 1987. He scored 4 penalties during his international career, 12 points on aggregate. He was a member of his national side for the 1st Rugby World Cup in 1987 and played in 1 group match in 1987 against France in which he scored all of his 12 career points.

Honours
Farul Constanța
 Cupa României: 1986-87

References

External links

Romeo Bezușcu's Profile at RugbyWorldCup
Romeo Bezușcu's Profile at Eurosport

1964 births
Living people
Romanian rugby union players
Romania international rugby union players
Rugby union fly-halves